XHCNL-TDT is a Televisa owned and operated television station in Monterrey, Nuevo León, broadcasting on virtual channel 8. Their signal is also available on SKY Mexico satellite system, on channel 152.

History
XHCNL came to air in the late 1980s as an oddity in a large concession primarily awarded to expand Televisa's reach in rural areas. In the mid-1990s, it raised its power and became known as "Tu Objetivo Visual", carrying some local programs. In 2006, a swap between XEFB and XHCNL resulted in XHCNL becoming Televisa Monterrey (or Monterrey Televisión), the local station for Monterrey with news and local productions. It also picked up XEFB's translator in Saltillo, Coahuila. On October 27, 2016, the change was reversed, with local programs moving to XEFB (now on virtual channel 4) and Teleactiva moving to channel 34.

Digital television
The station's digital signal currently features two subchannels:

On September 24, 2015, XHCNL shut off its analog signal; its digital signal on UHF channel 48 remained.

In 2017, XHCNL moved from physical channel 48 to its former analog channel 34 in order to clear the 600 MHz band for mobile services.

On December 23, 2017, XHCNL changed virtual channels from 34 to 8.
In 2016, XHCNL added a shopping channel partly owned by Televisa, CJ Grand Shopping, on its second digital subchannel; the channel was removed in March 2019 after Televisa divested its 50% stake in the channel in 2018. In June, a new CV Shopping channel wholly owned by Televisa was added to XHCNL's second subchannel.

Repeaters

Two repeaters provide fill-in coverage in the Monterrey metropolitan area:

|-

|}

References

Televisa Regional
Television stations in Monterrey
Television channels and stations established in 1988
1988 establishments in Mexico